Eric R. Scerri is a chemist, writer and philosopher of science of Maltese origin. He is a lecturer at the University of California, Los Angeles; and the founder and editor-in-chief of Foundations of Chemistry, an international peer reviewed journal covering the history and philosophy of chemistry, and chemical education.

He is a world authority on the history and philosophy of the periodic table and is the author and editor of several books in this and related fields. Scerri was a participant in the 2014 PBS documentary film, The Mystery of Matter.

Scerri attended Walpole Grammar School in Ealing.  He received his BSc from Westfield College (University of London), his Certificate in Postgraduate Study from the University of Cambridge, his MPhil from the University of Southampton, and his PhD from King's College London.

Research interests
Scerri's research has mainly been in the history and philosophy of chemistry, in particular on the question of the extent to which chemistry reduces to quantum mechanics.  He has specialized in the study of the periodic table of the elements, including its historical origins and its philosophical significance.  More recent writings have included critiques of claims for the emergence of chemistry and the existence of downward causation.

In addition to historical and philosophical work Scerri has published numerous articles in the chemical education literature, including accounts of the electronic structures of transition metals and the occurrence of anomalous electron configurations.

In A Tale of Seven Elements (2013) Scerri recounts the story of the discovery of the seven elements missing from the periodic table shortly after the turn of the 20th century, including the setbacks, misguided claims, and sometimes acrimonious priority debates and disputes.

In December 2015, Scerri was appointed by IUPAC as the chair of a project to make a recommendation on the composition of group 3—whether it should be the elements Sc, Y, La and Ac; or Sc, Y, Lu and Lr. In January 2021, the project issued a provisional report in IUPAC's news magazine Chemistry International suggesting Sc, Y, Lu and Lr. This accords with a previous IUPAC report from 1988, as well as a suggestion by Lev Landau and Evgeny Lifshitz in their Course of Theoretical Physics.

Most recently (2016) he proposed a new evolutionary approach to the philosophy of science based on seven case studies of little known scientists such as John Nicholson, Anton Van den Broek and Edmund Stoner. Scerri has argued that these lesser known figures are just as significant as the heroic personalities in that they constitute the missing gaps in a gradual evolutionary and organic growth in the body of scientific knowledge. Although he rejects the occurrence of scientific revolutions as envisioned by Thomas Kuhn, Scerri very much supports Kuhn's notion that scientific progress is non-teleological and that there is no approach towards an external truth.

Second editions of Scerri's two most cited books were published in 2019 and 2020.

Publications

Books
2020, What is a Chemical Element? co-edited with E. Ghibaudi, Oxford University Press, New York, 
2020, The Periodic Table: Its Story and Its Significance, 2nd edition, Oxford University Press, New York, 
2019, The Periodic Table: A Very Short Introduction, 2nd edition, Oxford University Press, New York, 
2018, Mendeleev to Oganesson: A Multidisciplinary Perspective on the Periodic Table, with co-editor G Restrepo, Oxford University Press, New York, 
2016, A Tale of Seven Scientists, and a New Philosophy of Science, Oxford University Press, New York, 
2016, Essays in the Philosophy of Chemistry, with co-editor Fisher G. Oxford University Press, New York, 
2015, Philosophy of Chemistry: Growth of a New Discipline, with co-editor McIntyre L. Springer, Dordrecht, Berlin,  
2013, A tale of seven elements, Oxford University Press, Oxford, 
2013, 30-second elements: The 50 most significant elements, each explained in half a minute, as editor, Metro Books, New York, 
2011, The periodic table: A very short introduction, Oxford University Press, Oxford, 
2009, Selected papers on the periodic table, Imperial College Press, London, 
2008, Collected papers on philosophy of chemistry, Imperial College Press, London, 
2007, The periodic table: Its story and its significance, Oxford University Press, New York, 
2006, Philosophy of Chemistry: Synthesis of a New Discipline, with co-editors Baird D & McIntyre L, Springer, Dordrecht,

Articles
2022, In Praise of Triads, Foundations of Chemistry,24, 284-300.
2022, Various forms of the periodic table including the left-step table, the regularization of atomic number triads and first member anomalies, Chem Texts, 8, 6 (2022). 	https://doi.org/10.1007/s40828-021-00157-8
2021, Integrating the History and Philosophy of Science and restoring the centrality of the Periodic Table into a college general chemistry course, Chimica Nella Scuola, 4, 16-23.
2021, Provisional report on Discussions on Group 3 of the Periodic Table, Chemistry International, January–March issue, 2021, 31-34.
2021, 'Reassessing the Notion of a Kuhnian Revolution: What Happened in 20th C. Chemistry, A Commentary on Wray’s claim of the discovery of atomic number as a revolution in chemistry', in Interpreting Kuhn, B. Wray (ed.), Cambridge University Press.
2021, 'How was Nicholson’s highly inconsistent atomic theory able to yield explanatory as well as predictive success?' in Contemporary Scientific Challenge from the History of Science, T.Lyons, P.Vickers, (eds.), Oxford University Press, New York.
2021, 'The impact of twentieth century physics on the periodic table and some remaining questions in the twenty-first century', in Giunta, C.J.; Mainz, V. V.; Girolami, G. S. Eds. 150 Years of the Periodic Table - A Commemorative Symposium; Perspectives on the History of Chemistry; Springer: Heidelberg
2020, 'On Chemical Natural Kinds', Journal for the General Philosophy of Science, 51, 427–445.  
2020, 'Recent attempts to improve the periodic table', Philosophical Transactions of the Royal Society A, 378: 20190300.http://dx.doi.org/10.1098/rsta.2019.0300
2020, 'The Periodic Table and the Turn to Practice', Studies in History and Philosophy of Science A, 79, 87-93.
2019, 'Happy Sesquicentennial to the Periodic Table', Scientific American, January 22.
idem, 'Looking backwards and forwards at the development of the periodic table', Chemistry International, January–March, 16-20.
idem, 'Happy 150th Birthday to the Periodic Table', Chemistry A European Journal, 25, 7410–7415.
idem, 'Five ideas in chemical education that must die', Foundations of Chemistry, 21, 61–69. 
idem, 'Can Quantum Ideas Explain Chemistry’s Greatest Icon?' Nature, 565, 557-558.
2018, 'How Should the Periodic System be Regarded?', The Rutherford Journal, vol. 5
idem., 'What Elements Belong in Group 3?', with coauthor Parsons W, in E R Scerri & G Restrepo (eds), Mendeleev to Oganesson, Oxford University Press, New York. 
2017, 'The Gulf Between Chemistry and Philosophy of Chemistry, Then and Now', Structural Chemistry, 28, 1599-1605
idem., 'On the Madelung Rule', response to Marc Henry's “Super-Saturated Chemistry”, Inference , March.
idem., 'El descubrimiento de la tabla periódica como un caso de descubrimiento simultáneo', Epistemologia e Historia de la Ciencia (Argentina), 1, 2.
2016, 'The Changing Views of a Philosopher of Chemistry on the Question of Reduction', in E R Scerri & G Fisher (eds), Essays in the Philosophy of Chemistry, Oxford University Press, New York
idem., 'Which Elements Belong to Group 3 of the Periodic Table', Chemistry International, Volume 38, Issue 2, Pages 22–23, March
2014, ''The discovery of the periodic table as a case of simultaneous discovery', Philosophical Transactions of the Royal Society A, vol. 373, no. 2037
2013, 'The trouble with the aufbau principle', Education in Chemistry, vol. 50, no. 6, pp. 24–26
2012, 'Mendeleev's periodic table is finally completed and what to do about group 3?', Chemistry International, vol. 34, no. 4
2010, 'Chemistry in its element – Lawrencium', Royal Society of Chemistry, viewed 30 December 2013
2009, 'Periodic change', Chemistry World, March, pp. 46–49
2007, 'The ambiguity of reduction', Hyle, vol. 13, no. 2, pp. 67–81
idem., 'Trouble in the periodic table', Education in Chemistry, January, pp. 13–17
idem., 'Reduction and Emergence in Chemistry - Two Recent Approaches', "Philosophy of Science," 74, pp. 920–931
2005, 'Some Aspects of the Metaphysics of Chemistry and the Nature of the Elements', Hyle, vol. 11, no. 2, pp. 127–145
2003, 'Hafnium', Chemical & Engineering News, vol. 81, no. 36, p. 138, 
idem., 'Philosophy of Chemistry', Chemistry International, vol. 25, no. 3, pp. 6–8
2001, 'Prediction and the periodic table', with coauthor Worrall J, Studies in history and philosophy of science, 32, no. 3, pp. 407–452
idem., 'The Recently Claimed Observation of Atomic Orbitals and Some Related Philosophical Issues', Philosophy of Science, 68, (proceedings), pp. S76–S78
1997, 'Has the Periodic Table Been Successfully Axiomatized?' Erkenntnis, vol. 47, no. 2, pp. 229–243
idem., 'The Case for the Philosophy of Chemistry', with coauthor, McIntyre L, Synthese, vol. 111, pp. 213–232 
1994, 'Has Chemistry Been at Least Approximately Reduced to Quantum Mechanics ?', Philosophy of Science, PSA Proceedings, vol. 1, pp. 160–170
1991, 'Chemistry, spectroscopy, and the question of reduction', Journal of Chemical Education, vol. 68, no. 2, pp. 122–126
idem., 'The Electronic Configuration Model, Quantum Mechanics and Reduction', British Journal for the Philosophy of Science, vol. 42, no. 3, pp. 309–325
1986, 'The Tao of Chemistry', Journal of Chemical Education, vol. 63, no. 2, pp. 106–107

References

External links
Home page of Eric Scerri
Foundations of Chemistry
Career Advice for Scientists from Eric Scerri

Interview with editor of Nature Chemistry
Mystery of Matter, 3-part Public Broadcast Television Series
 at Concordia University, Montreal (2012?)
 at University of Kansas, Lawrence (2012?)
Ten most influential chemists today (2020)

21st-century American philosophers
Alumni of King's College London
British expatriates in the United States
21st-century American chemists
People involved with the periodic table
University of California, Los Angeles faculty
American historians of philosophy
Philosophers of science
Living people
1953 births
Historians from California